Department of Science may refer to:

 Department of Science (1972–75), an Australian government department
 Department of Science (1975–78), an Australian government department
 Department of Science (1984–87), an Australian government department